Apa y Tepeapulco was a Spanish corregimiento during the colonial period in new Spain (what is today Mexico).  It was located in south-eastern Hidalgo consisting of the modern municipalities of Almoloya, Tepeapulco and at least some of Tlanalapa.

The region was a frontier province of the Aztec Empire.  Tepepolco was also part of this province, and it was a point of resistance to Tlaxcallan invasions.  It may have had a connection with Huehue-ichocayan.  

In 1527 the Franciscans established a parish at Tepeapulco.

The population was primarily Nahuatl and Otomi speaking prior to the Spanish incursion.  By 1521 the Spanish power had been asserted over this area.  It was made its own corrigimento in 1531.  For a brief time around 1545 Tlanalapa was a separate unit but was reunited with Apa y Tepeapulco shortly later.

In 1787 when the government of New Spain was reorganized Apa y Tepeapulco was made a subdelegacion retaining its old boundaries.  

In 1792 the population consisted of 1,295 Spaniard (both peninsulares and creoles), 651 mestizos, 1,059 mulattos and at least 5,000 indios.

Sources
Gerhard, Peter. Guide to the Historical Geography of New Spain. Cambridge: Cambridge University Press, 1972.

1531 establishments in New Spain
History of Mexico